Old Blenheim Bridge was a wooden covered bridge that spanned Schoharie Creek in North Blenheim, New York, United States. The 1862 Bridgeport Covered Bridge in Nevada County, California, currently undergoing repairs due to 1986 flooding (rebuild started in 2019) is longer overall at  but is argued to have a  clear span. The bridge, opened in 1855, was also one of the oldest of its type in the United States. It was destroyed by flooding resulting from Tropical Storm Irene in 2011. Rebuilding of the bridge commenced in 2017 and was completed in 2018.

History
Nicholas Montgomery Powers was brought in from Vermont to build the bridge by a group of local businessmen who formed the Blenheim Bridge Company for the purpose of constructing this bridge. The bridge opened in 1855, and remained in use for vehicles until 1932, when a steel truss bridge was constructed nearby. Since then, the bridge was maintained as a historic site open to pedestrians. It was declared a National Historic Landmark in 1964 and designated as a National Historic Civil Engineering Landmark by the American Society of Civil Engineers in 1983.

On August 28, 2011, record flooding along the Schoharie Creek, due to Tropical Storm Irene, resulted in the bridge being washed away and completely destroyed.

Longest bridge
Many sources simply claimed the Old Blenheim Bridge was the longest surviving single-span covered bridge, without getting into span length vs. total length. There are also sources that claim the Bridgeport Covered Bridge in California is longer. The New York Covered Bridge Society states that Blenheim bridge was  longer than "a bridge in California" (presumably Bridgeport), in terms of clear span. Blenheim's clear span was originally , according to this website.

Destruction
The bridge was destroyed on August 28, 2011, as a result of flooding from Tropical Storm Irene.

A witness saw its roof deposited onto a modern bridge just downstream, when the bridge was swept away at about 1 p.m.

On July 21, 2015, National Historic Landmark designation for the bridge was withdrawn and the property was delisted from the National Register of Historic Places.

Replacement

A replacement for the bridge was built in 2017, exactly reproducing the design of the original.  It was built to stand  higher to avoid future floods.  Plans were for the bridge to "look and feel like it's the old bridge".  Plans for replacement of the bridge took much time and effort;  funding for reconstruction was at first opposed by FEMA, and the chair of a local committee characterized it as "a battle" to get approval.  The construction cost $6.7 million, funded 75 percent by FEMA and 25 percent by New York State;  it was started in early 2017.  Preserved pieces of the original bridge were included as a memorial.  The construction contract was advertised with bids due in October 2016 by the New York State's Governor's Office on Storm Recovery. On October 3, 2018, PBS broadcast an episode of the Nova documentary TV series about the reconstruction.

Gallery

See also
List of bridges documented by the Historic American Engineering Record in New York
Hartland Bridge – longest covered bridge (multiple spans) in the world; Hartland, New Brunswick
Smolen–Gulf Bridge – longest covered bridge (multiple spans) in the United States, Ashtabula County, Ohio
Bartonsville Covered Bridge - a shorter covered bridge in Rockingham, Vermont, also destroyed by Tropical Storm Irene, replaced in 2013; it still carries traffic

References

External links

Photos of Blenheim Covered Bridge by Douglas Kerr
Photos of Blenheim Covered Bridge by Charles Peifer
Blenheim Bridge, at New York State Covered Bridge Society

Covered bridges on the National Register of Historic Places in New York (state)
Historic American Buildings Survey in New York (state)
Historic American Engineering Record in New York (state)
Bridges completed in 1834
Historic Civil Engineering Landmarks
Wooden bridges in New York (state)
Buildings and structures in Schoharie County, New York
Transportation in Schoharie County, New York
Tourist attractions in Schoharie County, New York
Demolished buildings and structures in New York (state)
Pedestrian bridges in New York (state)
Former road bridges in the United States
Demolished bridges in the United States
National Register of Historic Places in Schoharie County, New York
Road bridges on the National Register of Historic Places in New York (state)
Former National Historic Landmarks of the United States
Buildings and structures destroyed by flooding
Rebuilt buildings and structures in the United States
Former National Historic Landmarks in New York (state)